() is at the western end of the Sobo Mountain range in Ōita Prefecture. It is now part of the Sobo, Katamuki and Okue Biosphere Reserve.

Formation 
It is believed that the foundation of the Sobo mountain range occurred in two periods of volcanic activity. The first, around 13 million years ago, was buried in the second period of volcanic activity ending about 10 million years ago leaving the landscape seen today. From about 3 million years ago the activity of the Aso volcano caused nearby pyroclastic flow deposition.

Environment 
The slopes of the mountain is covered by old-growth forest. Typical species include Japanese beech and hemlock. Going up from the lowland, the vegetation changes from evergreen (glossy-leaved) forest over conifer forest halfway up the mountain, to Suzu-take and beech close to the summit.

References 

Mountains of Ōita Prefecture